Fernando Cerchio (7 August 1914 – 19 August 1974) was an Italian film director and screenwriter. He directed more than 30 films between 1940 and 1972.

Selected filmography

 Men of the Mountain (1943)
 Mistress of the Mountains (1950)
 The Crossroads (1951)
 The Tired Outlaw (1952)
 Son of the Hunchback (1952)
 Lulu (1953) 
 Farewell, My Beautiful Lady (1954)
 The Count of Bragelonne (1954)
 Desert Warrior (1957) 
 The Mysteries of Paris (1957)
 Herod the Great (1958)
 Head of a Tyrant (1959)
 Cleopatra's Daughter (1960)
 Nefertiti, Queen of the Nile (1961) 
 Invasion 1700 (1962)
 Toto vs. Maciste (1962)
 Toto and Cleopatra  (1963)
 Toto vs. the Black Pirate (1964) 
 Mutiny at Fort Sharpe (1966)
 Top Secret (1967)
 Il marchio di Kriminal (1967)

External links

1914 births
1974 deaths
Italian film directors
Italian male screenwriters
20th-century Italian screenwriters
People from Luserna San Giovanni
20th-century Italian male writers
Comedy film directors
Parody film directors
Italian parodists